List of foreign footballers in European communist countries is a list that gathers all footballers that played as foreigners in the top leagues of the countries that had Communist regimes during 20th century in Europe. It lists the countries that formed the Eastern Bloc, COMECON, plus Yugoslavia which, despite politically being a Non-Aligned country during Cold war,  did in fact have a one-party communist regime. Albania, which was ruled by the Albanian Communist Party since the end of Second World War until 1991 is also included.

History
When communist regimes took power in countries of Central and Eastern Europe, club football in those countries suffered major transformations. Clubs were nationalised, and started to be part of a vast doctrine in which sports played a crucial role in the society. Clubs were reorganised in a way to follow this new doctrine imposed by the new proletarian regimes. Many previously successful clubs were disbanded, while new clubs representing and being backed by the various structures of the new regimes were created from their ashes. In Soviet Union communists took power in 1917, while in the rest of the countries the change of power happened in the Second World War. Most of the existing pre-war clubs were labeled as bourgeoisie, some also as monarchist or nationalistic, and ended disbanded. Only the ones which already represented labour class were kept active. To fill the vacuum, new clubs were created, which held names and symbols representative of the values communism promoted. Most popular names were Dynamo (Berlin, Bucharest, Dresden, Kyiv, Minsk, Moscow, Tbilisi, Tirana, Zagreb, etc.), Spartak (Moscow, Subotica, Trnava, Vladikavkaz, etc.; Sparta in case of Prague one) or Lokomotiv (backed by the railways, Durrës, Košice, Leipzig, Moscow, Plovdiv, Sofia, etc.; Lokomotiva for Belgrade and Zagreb). Another form was Železničar/Željezničar in Yugoslavia, meaning railway worker, examples Belgrade, Sarajevo, Smederevo, etc. Miners clubs were either known as Shakhtar in Soviet Union (Donetsk, Karagandy, Saligorsk, Sverdlovsk, etc.) or as Rudar in Yugoslavia (Kostolac, Pljevlja, Prijedor, Velenje, etc.) Metallurgical industry clubs were named as Metalurg (Donetsk, Rustavi, Skopje, Zaporizhya, Zestafoni, etc.), Metalist (Kharkiv) or Yugoslav version Čelik, iron (Nikšić, Zenica, etc.) Other names were Mladost meaning youth (Apatin, Bački Jarak, Kakanj, Lučani, Podgorica, Ugljevik, etc.), Sloboda meaning freedom (Novi Grad, Tuzla, Užice, etc.; Svoboda Ljubljana), Borac meaning fighter (Banja Luka, Čačak, Šamac, etc.), Jedinstvo meaning unity (Belgrade, Bihać, Bijelo Polje, Brčko, Ub, Užice, etc.), or, perhaps the most characteristic name of all politically left-wing founded clubs, the name Radnički, meaning Labourer's (Belgrade, Ivangrad, Kovin, Kragujevac, Lukavac, Niš, Obrenovac, Pirot, Sombor, Svilajnac, etc.; Rabotnički Skopje and RFK Novi Sad and RNK Split as well). Clubs were controlled by powerful structures within the regime such as the army or the interior ministries. Examples of "Army clubs" heldf usually names as CSKA (Moscow and Sofia) or Partizan (Belgrade and Tirana). Red Star, or just Star, was another popular name (Crvena zvezda from Belgrade or Gnjilane, Steaua from Bucharest, or Ruda Hvezda from Bratislava, but also there were Red Stars from Paris, Zurich, Seaham, Caracas, Huambo, Beira and even Chicago). Besides the name, the club emblems often were changed in order to display the communist symbology.

Besides the nationalization of ownership, change in names, and emblems, the communist regimes also changed the management and structure of the teams. While previously most clubs did their best to bring star coaches and players by attracting them with high salaries, communist regimes diverted the focus into the local academies and domestic players. Many countries adopted restrictions such as age-limits for players to move abroad, and the signings of foreigners became unpopular habits. This made that many leagues which had previously had a significant number of clubs where it was common practice to sign foreign coaches and players, teams became entirely composed of domestic stuff and players. That fact is what makes this list peculiar.

Yugoslavia, which has been the only European communist country outside COMECOM and Soviet influence, is unsurprisingly the pioneer in (re)opening their clubs to foreigners. Much more open than the rest of communist countries, and being the leader of the Non-Aligned Movement, Yugoslavia had a significant presence of foreign students in its universities coming from Third World counties. Among them, some continued practicing sports while in Yugoslavia, and cases of African players which were registered in lower and amateur Yugoslav leagues occurred throughout time. In the top-league, although rare, the cases of players from COMECON countries in Yugoslavia were the only cases of foreigners in these leagues for most of the 1950s till 1970s. In 1980s Yugoslavia starts having its first Africans and South-Americans in its league. With few cases, Czechoslovakia, Hungary and Soviet Union follow suit.

Before communism
Foreigners played major role in the beginnings of clubs in Russian Empire. However, after the 1917 Revolution and the creation of Soviet Union, the vast majority of foreigners left the country and clubs played exclusively with domestic players all the way until the fall of Communism in late 1980s. The Baltic states were incorporated into Soviet Union in 1945 and afterwards became closed to foreign exchange. Previously they had been majorly influenced by the Central-European school just as most of the other countries we cover here. Football appeared in this part of Europe while still most of these countries were part of the Austro-Hungarian empire. Within the empire football became highly developed, and by early 20th century, football in these region was at pace with United Kingdom, Germany, France or Italy. The Central-European school became the avant-garde in football, and coaches from territories that was once Austro-Hungary were highly regarded throughout the globe. At the end of First World War, the Austro-Hungarian Empire dissolved, and the successor countries continued the tradition of its football school. Austria, Hungary, Czechoslovakia, Yugoslavia, Poland and Romania became the core that would compete against the few other football powerhouses. Prior WWII it was common to see Austrian and Hungarian coaches in all European top clubs, plus players, added by Czechoslovaks and Yugoslavs. In clubs of all these Central-European leagues, it was common to see coaches and players from other parts of Europe. However, when communists came to power, this practice was discontinued, and clubs were forced to develop their schools and focus on domestic players only. Between the 1950s and 1970s this was the reality of all countries. It will be at the 1980s that this reality slowly starts to change.

Pioneers
By late 1980 and early 1990s it is notorious the presence of Soviet players in these leagues. Mentality begins changing at this point, and signings of other communist-country players slowly open-way to signings of players from other parts of the world. In Yugoslavia, foreigners with Yugoslav origins also contributed to the massification of imports. However, in the entire region, it was the fall of Berlin Wall that marked the real shift, and the start of foreign players in these league. During the 1980s only a handful of players from other continents had been signed, mostly in Czechoslovak, Yugoslav and Hungarian leagues.

By late 1980s clubs from these countries started paying attention to world competitions. Signed were the players that shined at 1988 Olympics, cases such as of the Chinese players Jia and Liu brought by Partizan, Nigerian Okwaraji by Dinamo Zagreb, and Soviet goalkeeper Prudnikov by Velez Mostar, Zambians Chansa, Makinka and Mwanza signed by Soviet Second League Pomir Dushambe, while American Vermes was signed by Hungarian side Győri ETO .

It will be in 1990 that the world will see the emergence of clubs from communist countries competing to sign players in highlight at the 1990 FIFA World Cup. Dinamo Zagreb won the bid in signing Costa Rican duo Medford and Gonzalez, his compatriot Chavez signed with Inter Bratislava, Colombians Redin and Pimiento with CSKA Sofia, Algerians Bouiche and Haraoui with Ferencvaros and Slovan Bratislava respectively and Americans Trittchuh by Sparta Prague, Bliss by Energie Cottbus, and Caligiuri by Hansa Rostock.

Signings happened between these leagues started being more frequent. When Yugoslav Red Star was building their European and Intercontinental Cup-winning team in the late 1980s, their target became the Romanian international, one of main pillars and captain of Steaua that had won European Cup in 1987. Since Romania was still closed and didn't allow their footballers to emigrate, they convinced him to defect, and after an intense struggle with rivals Partizan, they signed him in 1989 although he had to wait an entire year for FIFA to allow him to debut in official games. After him, many others followed. Yugoslav Binić moved to Sparta Prague, Czechoslovak Jeslinek to Yugoslav Hajduk Split, Soviets Tatarchuk to Czechoslovak Slavia Prague, and Karavajevs and Ruzgys to Yugoslav OFK Belgrade. As this were still the beginnings of signings of foreigners, bad decisions also happened. A lower-half table side NK Osijek was not doing well in their campaign in the Yugoslav First League so to turn their luck they brought three Soviet players for trials. Two of them, Metlitskiy and Shalimo were granted a contract, while the third one, Andriy Shevchenko, was deemed as "not good enough".

Besides this high-profile signings, there was an increase in moves from one country to another. In Hungary for instance, there was a major influx of ethnic Hungarian players from neighboring countries.

American footballers were present as pioneers among the foreign-signings in these leagues. Examples are signing of Sullivan and Vermes with Győri ETO, Trittschuh with Slavia Prague, Caligiuri with Hansa Rostock, Bliss with Energie Cottbus, or Mullholland with Lokomotiv Moscow.

Brazilians, who will storm these leagues later in the new millennium, had its first player in this part of the globe in Yugoslavia. It was a goalkeeper with Croatian roots, Domingo Franulovic, who was signed in 1956 by a bottom-table club RNK Split. Giving the fact that Franulovic was of Yugoslav origin and possessed double-nationality, the first real Brazilian signing happened in 1990, when Yugoslav top-league side Spartak Subotica brought three experienced Brazilians to their squad, Jatoba, Marquinhos and Monteiro.

Although Argentinian Roberto Oreb spent some time during the 1950s with teams that would later form FK Zemun, he has failed to debut in the league. Next South American was Peruvian international Jose Moreno who joined Yugoslav side Dinamo Zagreb in 1980 but played only for reserves team. So presumably, the first South-American footballers to debut in the top-leagues of former-communist countries were the three Brazilians of Spartak Subotica in 1990. A years later, the first major influx of South Americans was registered in the region, with five Argentinians signing for Polish Ekstaklasa teams in 1991.

Although some Africans students were registered and even played in lower-leagues during previous decades, the first African major signings happened in the 1980s. The first was Nigerian Umoh who signed with Hungarian Ujpest in 1982, followed by Gabonese Delicat who signed with Yugoslav side Vojvodina a year later.

The first ever Chinese players to play in a top-league in Europe were Xie Yuxin and Gu Guangming, playing with FC Zwolle (Netherlands) and SV Darmstadt 98 (Germany). They had come in summer 1987, but just half a year later, Jia Xiuquan and Liu Haidong arrived in Belgrade and played in the Yugoslav First League for next year.

First Australian player was Socceroos international Eddy Krncevic who came to Yugoslavia and played three seasons with Dinamo Zagreb, between 1981 and 1984.

The list
Below we have the list of foreigners that played in the leagues of communist countries in Europe. The list is divided by countries, and lists the nationalities of the players that played as foreigners. If the name of the player is bolded it means the player has senior national team appearances for their nation. Following players name is the club, or clubs in some cases, and next are the years the player has played at the club.

Albania
Bulgaria
 Nikolay Arabov – Tirana 1992–1993

Yugoslavia
 Naim Kryeziu – Tirana 1933–1939
 Riza Lushta – Tirana 1934–1939

Bulgaria
Albania
 Skënder Begeja – Akademik Sofia 1948–50

Colombia
 Carlos Pimiento – CSKA Sofia 1990–1992
 Bernardo Redín – CSKA Sofia 1990–1991

Egypt
 Magdy Tolba – Levski Sofia 1992–1993

Soviet Union
 Nazim Ajiev – Pirin Blagoevgrad 1992
 Borys Derkach – Levski Sofia 1991–1992
 Oleg Kazmirchuk – Haskovo 1992
 Igor Kislov – Etar 1990–96
 Oleg Morgun – Etar 1924, Levski Sofia 1991–1995
 Asylbek Momunov – Haskovo 1992
 Vladislav Nemeşcalo – Yantra 1992
 Ivan Shariy – Etar 1924 1989–1991
 Nematjan Zakirov – Pirin Blagoevgrad, PFC Velbazhd Kyustendil 1992–97

Yugoslavia
 Vlatko Kostov – Lokomotiv Sofia 1986–1988

Czechoslovakia
 Karel Burkert – Levski Sofia 1933–1934

Hungary
 István Pista – Levski Sofia 1939–1940
 Ernő Weinberger – Levski Sofia 1938–1939

Italy
 Egon Terzeta – FC Ticha, Vladislav Varna (1921–1928)
 Amedeo Kleva – Pobeda Sofia, Levski Sofia (1942–1953)

Netherlands
 Andre Brink – Levski Sofia (1936)

Russia
 Aleksandr Martynov – FC 13 (1921)
 Grigori Bogemsky – FC 13 (1921)
 Friedrich Kluyd – FC 13 (1921 – ?)
 Mikhail Borisov – Levski Sofia (1922–1923)
 Ivan Bulgakov – Vladislav Varna (1922–1930)
 Valeriy Rybak – Sava Ruse (1923)
 Yuri Surin – FC Slava
 Vasiliy Smirnov – FC Slava
 Vsevolod Kuznetsov – Napredak Ruse
 Marchenko – Napredak Ruse
 Dubeytis – Krakra Pernik

Czechoslovakia
Algeria
 Youssef Haraoui – Slovan Bratislava 1991–1993

Bulgaria
 Borislav Futekov – SK Kladno 1946–1947

Costa Rica
 José Carlos Chaves – Inter Bratislava 1990–1992

Hungary
 Tamás Andó – Jednota Košice 1946–1947
 Rudolf Illovszky – ŠK Bratislava 1946–1947
 János Klimcsók – Jednota Košice 1946–1947
 Attila Pintér – Dunajská Streda 1991–1992
 István Turbéky – Jednota Košice 1946–1948
 Eugen Wellisch – ŠK Bratislava 1946–1948

Indonesia
 Nil Maizar – Sparta Prague 1990–1992
 Rochy Putiray – Dukla Prague 1990–1991

Soviet Union
 Aleksandr Bokiy – Sigma Olomouc 1990–1992
 Viktor Dvirnyk – TJ Chemlon Humenné 1989–1990, Inter Bratislava 1990–1992, Sparta Prague 1992–1993
 Rashid Gallakberov – Tatran Prešov 1991–1993
 Oleg Kuzhlev – Žilina 1990–1991
 Vadym Lazorenko – Košice 1991–1992
 Valeri Masalitin – Sigma Olomouc 1992–1993
 Mykhaylo Olefirenko – Tatran Prešov 1991–1992
 Yuri Petukhov – Lokomotíva Košice 1991–1993
 Gennadi Salov – Dunajská Streda 1991–1992
 Oleksandr Sopko – Zemplín Michalovce 1991–1993
 Yuri Surov – Spartak Hradec Králové 1991–1992
 Vladimir Tatarchuk – Slavia Prague 1992–1994
 Sergei Timofeyev – Dunajská Streda 1989–1992
 Stanislav Tskhovrebov – Slovan Bratislava 1992–1993
 Igor Yakubovskiy – Dynamo České Budějovice 1992–1993
 Mykola Yurchenko – Zbrojovka Brno 1991–1993
 Yevgeni Yurka – Prostějov 1945–1946
 Aleksandr Zhitkov – Tatran Prešov 1991–1992, Vítkovice 1992, Bohemians Prague 1993

United States
 Steve Trittschuh – Sparta Prague 1990–1991

Yugoslavia
 Dragiša Binić – Slavia Prague 1991–1993
 Vinko Golob – Bohemians Prague 1946–1948
 Dejan Joksimović – Sparta Prague 1991–1992
 Valdet Shoshi – Vítkovice 1990–1991

Zambia
 Timothy Mwitwa – Sparta Prague 1990–1991

Austria
 Karel Böhm – Slezská Ostrava 1937–1940
 Franz Cisar – SK Moravská Slavia Brno 1935–1936, Prostějov 1937–1938
 Karl Glotzmann – Teplitzer FK 1932–1933
 Otto Haftl – Teplitzer FK 1929–1930, Sparta Prague 1930–1932
 Johann Hoffmann – DSV Saaz 1932–1936
 Franz Hribar – DSV Saaz 1935–1936
 Franz Kleinpeter – Bohemians AFK Vršovice 1934–1935
 Rudolf Kubesch – SK Moravská Slavia Brno 1936–1937
 Adolf Patek – DFC Prague 1925, 1934–1934, Sparta Prague 1927–1931
 Franz Radakovic – SK Náchod 1932–1933
 Wilhelm Steuer – DFC Prag 1918
 Johann Strnad – DFC Prag 1921–1925

Belgium
 Raymond Braine – Sparta Prague 1930–1936

Bulgaria
 Asen Peshev – Židenice 1933–1936

England
 James Ottaway – DFC Prague 1925

Germany
 Walter Hanke – Prostějov 1934–1935

Hungary
 Koloman Bobor – DFC Prague 1925, Slavia Prague 1927–1929
 Géza Csapo – Teplitzer FK 1933–1934, Viktoria Plzeň 1935–1938, Židenice 1938–1939
 József Ember – SK Plzeň 1932–1933
 Pál Jávor – ŠK Bratislava 1935–1938
 Alfred Schaffer – Sparta Prague 1925–1926

Poland
 Fritz Taussig – DFC Prague 1925, 1934–1936

Romania
 László Raffinsky – Židenice 1933–1935, Viktoria Plzeň 1935, DFC Prague 1936

Soviet Union
 Sergej Bulgakov – Židenice 1933–1934
 Cebek Chanchinov – Viktoria Žižkov 1936–1937
 Aleksandr Ulyanov – Sparta Prague 1930–1931, DFC Prague 1935–1936
 Bayir Ulyanov – Náchod 1939–1940
 Naran Ulyanov – DFC Prague 1935–1936

Yugoslavia
 Svetozar Đanić – Židenice 1937–1938, Viktoria Plzeň 1938–1939
 Milovan Jakšić – Slavia Prague 1934–1935
 Franjo Wölfl – Viktoria Plzeň 1935–1937

East Germany
Bulgaria
 Petar Aleksandrov – Energie Cottbus 1990–1991
 Antonio Ananiev – Energie Cottbus 1990–1991

West Germany
 Peter Lux – Dynamo Dresden 1990–1991

Hungary
 József Dzurják – Chemnitzer FC 1990–1991
 Péter Disztl – Rot-Weiß Erfurt 1990–1992

Soviet Union
 Anatoliy Demyanenko – 1. FC Magdeburg 1990–1991

United States
 Brian Bliss – Energie Cottbus 1990–1991
 Paul Caligiuri – Hansa Rostock 1990–1991

Yugoslavia
 Munever Krajišnik – Carl Zeiss Jena 1990–1991

Hungary
Algeria
 Naçer Bouiche  – Ferencváros – 1990–1991

Congo
 Jean-Claude Mbemba – Vasas, Veszprém – 1988–1996

Iran
 Amir Hashemi – Vasas – 1990–91
 Nader Mirahmadian – Vasas – 1990–91

Netherlands
 Jos Smeets – Haladás – 1985–1986

Nigeria
 Agustino Igbinadolor – Veszprém – 1988–1990
 Patrick Umoh – Újpest – 1982–1983, Csepel – 1985–1986

Romania
 Gheorghe Bănică –  Tatabánya – 1991–1992
 Ion Bogdan – MTK Budapest – 1946–1947
 Sorin Cigan – Szeged SC, Újpest, Ferencváros, Vasas, Stadler – 1990–1995
 Petru Chiratcu – Győr, FC Sopron – 1991–1992, 1993–1995 
 Romulus Gabor – Diósgyőri VTK – 1991–1992
 Ovidiu Lazăr – Budapest Honvéd – 1991–1992
 Gheorghe Mărginean – Debrecen – 1990–1991
 Zsolt Muzsnay – Videoton FC – 1990–1991, 1992–1995
 Adrian Negrău – Budapest Honvéd, BVSC Budapest, Haladás – 1991–1994, 1995–1998
 Ioan Petcu – Diósgyőri VTK – 1991–1992
 Gheorghe Pena – Győr, Csepel, Budapest Honvéd – 1991–1996
 Florian Radu – Szentlőrinci AC – 1947–1948
 Dorel Toderaş – Debrecen – 1990–1991, 1993–1994
 Gheorghe Tulba – Debrecen – 1989–1991
 Viorel Vancea – Videoton FC, Budapest Honvéd, Békéscsaba, Vasas, BVSC Budapest – 1989–1995
 Ioan Varga – Újpest – 1990–1991
 Nistor Văidean – Győr – 1990–1992
 Ion Voicu – Vasas – 1990–1991
 Ion Zare – BFC Siófok, Pécsi MFC – 1990–1993, 1993–1994

Soviet Union
 Vasyl Rats – Ferencváros – 1991–1992

United States
 Christopher Sullivan – Győri ETO – 1989–1990, 1996–1997
 Peter Vermes – Győri ETO – 1988–1989

Yugoslavia
 Srđan Bošković – Újpest – 1990–1991
 Radovan Marić – Vasas – 1988–1989
 Momčilo Medić – Veszprém – 1989–1990
 Mirsad Sprečak – Videoton – 1989–1990, Siofok – 1990–1991, Veszprém – 1992–1993
 Mirko Tintar – Videoton – 1989–1990

Austria
 Viktor Blicenez – Sabaria FC 1926–1927
 Ottokar Buresch – Sabaria FC 1926–1929
 Otto Höss – Bástya Szegedin 1926–1928
 Ignaz Ludwig – Bástya Szegedin 1927–1928
 Heinrich Müller – MTK Budapest 1934–1940
 Anton Powolny – Attila 1927–1928, Bástya Szeged 1928–1929
 Joseph Schneider – MTK Budapest 1927–1929

England
 Hugo Graham – MTK Budapest 1907–1908
 Andrew Hannach – MUE 1903
 Joseph Lane – MTK Budapest 1911–1913
 Robert Owen – MTK Budapest 1913–1914
 Edward Shires – MTK Budapest 1905
 John Watkins – 33 FC 1911–1912

France
 Henry Chambré – Nemzeti Törekvés 1921–1922

Romania
 Nicolae Simatoc – Nagyváradi Atlétikai Club – 1942–1945
 Jószef Szilvási – Gamma FC 1940–1942
 Ladislau Zilahi – Nagyváradi Atlétikai Club – 1942–1945

Yugoslavia
 Miloš Beleslin – Szegedi AK 1917–1919
 Dezider Demeter – Szegedi AK 1942–1943, Törekvés SE 1945–1946
 Jovica Jovanović aka György Jánosi – Tisza Szeged 1941–1942, Budafoki MTE 1945–1946
 Geza Šifliš – Ferencváros 1929–1931, Újpest 1937–1938

Poland
Argentina
Guillermo Coppola – GKS Katowice (1991)
Jorge García – Wisła Kraków (1991)
Fabio Marozzi – Śląsk Wrocław (1990–1991)
Germán Darío Rodríguez – Lech Poznań (1991)
Marcelo Süller – Igloopol Dębica (1991)

Belarus
Syarhey Amyalyusik – Motor Lublin (1990)
Andrey Hlebasolaw – Wisła Kraków (1992)
Yury Maleyew – Zawisza Bydgoszcz (1991–1994)
Syarhey Saladownikaw – Jagiellonia Białystok (1992)
Mikhail Smirnow – Zawisza Bydgoszcz (1992)
Syarhey Yasinski – Jagiellonia Białystok (1992)

Georgia
Gia Jishkariani – GKS Katowice (1992)
Zaza Revishvili – GKS Katowice (1992–1993)

Italia
Constante Bonazza – Arkonia Szczecin (1949–1951)

Lithuania
Algis Mackevičius – Jagiellonia Białystok (1989)

Russia
Sergei Basov – Śląsk Wrocław (1992–1993)
Aleksandr Gitselov – Zagłębie Lubin (1991–1992)
Vladimir Grechnyov – Śląsk Wrocław (1991–1992)
Aleksandr Kanishchev – Legia Warsaw (1991)
Sergei Mikhailov – Motor Lublin (1991–1992)
Vadim Rogovskoy – Zagłębie Lubin (1991–1995)
Sergei Shestakov – Legia Warsaw (1992–1993)
Sergei Shipovskiy – Hutnik Kraków (1992–1997)
Aleksey Zverev – Olimpia Poznań (1992)

Sweden
Stefan Jansson – Pogoń Szczecin (1992)

Ukraine
Anatoliy Demyanenko – Widzew Łódź (1991–1992)
Oleh Derevinskyi – Wisła Kraków (1991–1993)
Valeriy Hoshkoderya – Stal Stalowa Wola (1991)
Ruslan Kolokolov – Igloopol Dębica (1992)
Ihor Korniyets – Lech Poznań (1992)
Serhiy Raluchenko – Stal Mielec (1991–1992)
Vasyl Yatsyshyn – Igloopol Dębica (1991)
Volodymyr Yurchenko – Stal Stalowa Wola (1991–1992)

Zambia
Derby Makinka – Lech Poznań (1992)
Noel Sikhosana – Wisła Kraków (1991)

Soviet Union
Pavel Akimov – Legia Warsaw (1927–1930, 1934, 1936)

Yugoslavia
Grga Zlatoper – Legia Warsaw (1935–1936)

Romania
Albania
 Roland Agalliu – Universitatea Craiova, Oţelul Galaţi – 1990–1993
 Ilir Bozhiqi – FC Brașov – 1991–1995
 Agim Canaj – FC Brașov – 1991–1994
 Arben Kokalari – Oţelul Galaţi – 1991–1993
 Arben Minga – FC Brașov, Dacia Unirea Brăila – 1991–1993
 Perlat Musta – Dinamo București – 1991–1994

Czechoslovakia
 Jozsef Anthos – Cluj – 1946–1947

Ghana
 Nelson Mensah – Dinamo București – 1991–1993

Greece
 Kostas Choumis – Venus București, Gaz Metan Mediaș, UTA Arad – 1945–1950
 Dan Georgiadis – Juventus București – 1945–1947
 Christos Metskas – UTA Arad – 1957–1969
 Giorgos Zindros – Universitatea Craiova – 1974–1976

Hungary
 János Börzsei – Ferar Cluj – 1946–1947
 Árpád Fekete – Carmen București – 1946–1947
 Gyula Lóránt – UTA Arad – 1946–1947
 Adolf Vécsey – CA Oradea – 1946–1952

Moldova
 Alexandru Guzun – Rapid București – 1992–1994
 Alexei Scala – FCM Bacău – 1992–1993
 Iurie Scala – FCM Bacău – 1992–1993

Greece
 Kostas Choumis – Venus București – 1936–1945
 Dan Georgiadis – Juventus București – 1939–1945

Hungary
 Elemér Berkessy – Jiul Petroşani – 1924–1925
 Vilmos Engel – Mureşul Târgu Mureş – 1923–1924
 Vilmos Sipos – Rapid București – 1939–1941

Yugoslavia
 Kolnago Ferante – Rapid București 1931–1938

Soviet Union
Bulgaria
 Tenyo Minchev – Krylia Sovetov Samara 1989

Poland
 Bolesław Habowski – Spartak Moscow 1941
 Michał Matyas – Dynamo Kyiv 1940–1941
 Oleksandr Skotsen' – Dynamo Kyiv 1940–1941

Romania
 Lică Movilă – Zimbru Chisinau 1991 (2nd league)
 Claudiu Vaișcovici – Zimbru Chisinau 1991 (2nd league)

Spain
 Agustín Gómez Pagóla – Krylya Sovetov Moscow (1946), Torpedo Moscow (1947–1956)

United States
 Dale Mulholland – Lokomotiv Moscow 1990
 Adam Wolanin – Spartak Moscow 1941

Zambia
 Wisdom Mumba Chansa – Pamir Dushanbe 1989
 Derby Makinka – Pamir Dushanbe 1989
 Pearson Mwanza – Pamir Dushanbe 1989–1991

United Kingdom
F. Jones – BKS Moscow 1911–1913
T. Jones – BKS Moscow 1909–1913
Edward Thomas – BKS Moscow 1909–1910, 1912, KSO Orehovo 1911, EKS Moscow 1911

Yugoslavia
Albania
 Edmond Abazi – Hajduk Split 1990–1992
 Ramiz Bisha – Budućnost Podgorica 1991–1992
 Besnik Hasi – Prishtina 1991–1992
 Rahim Sherifi – Partizan Belgrade 19__–19__
 Zamir Shpuza – Budućnost Podgorica 1991–1992
 Dodë Tahiri – Budućnost Titograd 1946–1949

Australia
 Eddie Krncevic – Dinamo Zagreb 1981–1984

Brazil
 Domingo Franulovic – RNK Split 1956–1965
 Carlos Roberto Jatobá – Spartak Subotica 1990–1991
 Marquinhos – Spartak Subotica 1990–1991
 Osvaldo Monteiro – Spartak Subotica 1990–1991

Bulgaria
 Todor Atanaskov – Red Star Belgrade 1946–1948
 Blagoy Simeonov – OFK Belgrade 1946–1947
 Kiril Simonovski – Partizan Belgrade 1945–1950
 Metodi Tomanov – Radnički Niš 1990–1992

Canada
 Nick Dasovic – Dinamo Zagreb 1989–1991

China
 Jia Xiuquan – Partizan Belgrade 1987–1989
 Liu Haiguang – Partizan Belgrade 1987–1989

Costa Rica
 Rónald González – Dinamo Zagreb 1990–1991
 Hernán Medford – Dinamo Zagreb 1990–1991

Czechoslovakia
 Jiří Jeslínek – Hajduk Split 1990–1991
 Karel Skopový – Željezničar Sarajevo 1946–1950
 Milan Zvarík – Vojvodina 1985–1986

Gabon
 Anselme Délicat – Vojvodina 1983–1986

East Germany
 Boris Binkowski – Maribor 1965–1973

West Germany
 Rudolf Corn – Olimpija 1962–1970
 Robert Puha – Spartak Subotica 1989–1990

Greece
 Theodoros Apostolidis – Bor 1969–1972

Hungary
 János Báki – Radnički Kragujevac 1945–1946
 János Borsó – Vojvodina 1985–1986
 Ladiszlav Csányi – Vojvodina 1967–1969
 Pál Dárdai – Vojvodina 1985–1986
 József Dzurják – Spartak Subotica 1990–1991
 István Gligor – OFK Belgrade 1973–1974
 Jenő Kalmár – Radnički Belgrade 1945–1946
 József Lakatoș – 14. Oktobar Niš 1946–1947
 Tamás Nagy – Spartak Subotica 1990–1991
 István Nyers – Spartak Subotica 1945–1946
 Gyula Spitz – Partizan Belgrade 1946–1947
 Ladiszlav Tőrők – Nafta Lendava 1946–1947

Italy
 Aldo Giurini – Kvarner Rijeka 1952–1954, Lokomotiva Zagreb 1954–1955
 Mario Ravnich – Kvarner Rijeka 1946–1949
 Franco Rosignoli – Maribor 1967–1971

Nigeria
 Samuel Okwaraji – Dinamo Zagreb 1985–1986

Romania
 Miodrag Belodedici – Red Star Belgrade 1989–1992
 Aurel Han – Spartak Subotica 1991–1992
 Vasile Păunescu – 14. Oktobar Niš 1946–1947
 Virgil Popescu – Partizan Belgrade 1946–1948

Soviet Union
 Asteri Filaktov – OFK Belgrade 1963–1964
 Pavel Georgijevski – Vardar Skopje 1975–1984
 Oļegs Karavajevs – OFK Belgrade 1990–1993
 Mikhail Markhel – Budućnost Podgorica 1991–1992
 Aliaksandr Metlitskiy – Osijek 1990–1991
 Aleksei Prudnikov – Velež Mostar 1990–1991, Sarajevo 1991–1992
 Kęstutis Ruzgys – OFK Belgrade 1991–1992
 Andrei Shalimo – Osijek 1990–1991
 Ivan Spotar – OFK Belgrade 1957–1958
 Mykhailo Stelmakh – Spartak Subotica 1991–1992

Sweden
 Frederick Enaholo – Vojvodina 1991–1992
 Niclas Nylen – Vojvodina 1984–1985

Switzerland
 Darije Kalezić – Velež Mostar 1987–1994

United States
 Christopher Sulincevski – Vardar Skopje 1988–1989

Albania
 Loka Kotrri – Obilić Nikšić 1938–1939
 Toni Kotrri – Obilić Nikšić 1938–1939

Austria
 Alois Beranek – Concordia Zagreb 1923–1924
 Rudolf Chmelicek – Slavija Osijek 1936–1937, Građanski Zagreb 1937–1938
 Karl Dürschmied – Athletic SK Celje 1920–1921
 Ferdinand Götz – SAŠK Sarajevo 1921–1931
 Viktor Götz – SAŠK Sarajevo 1922–1923, 1925–1931, Građanski Zagreb 1923–1925
 Rudolf Juzek – VŠK Varaždin 1923–1924
 Karl Hammerer – SAŠK Sarajevo 1930–1931
 Karl Heinlein – Građanski Zagreb 1918–1922
 Toni Krammer – Concordia Zagreb 1940–1942
 Robert Lang – Jugoslavija Belgrade 1920–1921
 Viktor Löwenfeld – Concordia Zagreb 1921–1925
 Franz Mantler – Hajduk Split 1921 Građanski Zagreb 1921–1930
 Alexander Neufeld aka Sándor Nemes – BSK Belgrade 1932–1933
 Vilim Pammer – Primorje Ljubljana 1924–1925
 Rudolf Rupec – Građanski Zagreb 1920–1923
 August Sadek – Viktorija Zagreb 1924–1925
 Unterreiter – Ilirija Ljubljana 1929–1930
 Karl Zankl – Ilirija Ljubljana 1925–(1926)

Bulgaria
 Todor Atanaskov – Građanski Skoplje 1938–1940
 Stoyan Bogoev – Građanski Skoplje 1938–1939
 Anton Kuzmanov – Jedinstvo Belgrade 1939–1941
 Radanov – Mitić Belgrade 1942–1943
 Blagoy Simeonov – Građanski Skoplje 1938–1940
 Kiril Simonovski – Građanski Skoplje 1938–1941
 Bogdan Vidov – Građanski Skoplje 1939–1940

Czechoslovakia
 Dušan Bártek – SAŠK Sarajevo 1928–1929, Slavija Sarajevo 1929–1939
 Michael Bártek – Slavija Sarajevo 1929–1939
 Jaroslav Bohata – Hajduk Split 1923
 Otto Bohata – Hajduk Split 1913, 1919
 Josef Čapek – Vojvodina 1920
 Jaroslav Červený – Concordia Zagreb 1921
 František Haas – NAK Novi Sad 1936–1939, Vojvodina 1940–1941
 Hesko – Vojvodina 1923–1924
 Miloš Eckert – BSK Belgrade 1911–1914, 1918–1924
 Karel Jahn – SAŠK Sarajevo 1926–1927
 František Kotrba – NAK Novi Sad 193_–1937
 Alois Machek – Jugoslavija Belgrade 1920–1925
 Robert Peschek – SAŠK Sarajevo 1921–1922
 Venčel Petrovický – Jugoslavija Belgrade 1920–1921
 Václav Pinc – Hajduk Split 1922–1923
 Ján Podhradský – Vojvodina 1935–1936, BSK Belgrade 1936–1939
 Bohuslav Seger – Ilirija Ljubljana 1920–1922
 Karel Senecký – Hajduk Split 1937
 Rudolf Sloup-Štapl – Hajduk Split 1920–1921
 Jiří Sobotka – – Hajduk Split 1940–1941
 Jindřich Šoltys – Hajduk Split 1922–1923
 Karl Stalekar – Železničar Maribor 1938–1941
 Karel Stiasný – Hajduk Split 1919
 Lajoš Žiga – BASK Belgrade 1936–1937
 Frano Zoubek – Hajduk Split 1920–1921

England
 James Stone – Građanski Zagreb 1920–1921

France
 Maxime Benayer – BSK Belgrade 1923–1924

Germany
 Frank Dreiseitel – Građanski Zagreb 1940–1941
 Erich Feldmann – BUSK Belgrade 1924–1925
 Otto Magerle – SAŠK Sarajevo 1924–1925
 Gustav Mut – Grafičar Belgrade 1931–1932
 Rudolf Winkler – Rote Elf 1920

Greece
 Galanos – Obilić Belgrade 1942–1943
 Michalis Zistakis – Jedinstvo Belgrade 1924–1925, Radnički Belgrade 1925–1926

Hungary
 Eugen Ábrahám aka Saraz II – Vojvodina 1923–1924
 Jenő Ábrahám aka Saraz I – Vojvodina 1922–1925, Građanski Zagreb 1925–1927
 Lajos Barna – Bačka Subotica 1939–1940
 Gyula Blau – SK Velika Srbija 1913–1914, Juda Makabi 1921–1923
 Ferenc Bódi – NAK Novi Sad 1937–1942
 Rajmond Breznik – Juda Makabi 1923–1924, NTK Novi Sad 1924–1925
 Dezső – Vojvodina 1919–1920
 Kálmán Dobi – NAK Novi Sad 1924–1925
 Sándor Dudás – Vojvodina 1921–1926
 Gyula Ellbogen – BSK Belgrade 1923–1924
 Árpád Gőgös – NAK Novi Sad 193x–1937
 János Hajdú – NAK Novi Sad 1924–1925
 Nándor Hargitai – NAK Novi Sad 1940–1943
 Gyula Hegedűs – ŽAK Subotica 1935–1937
 Gyula Horváth – NAK Novi Sad 1924–1925
 János Karába – NAK Novi Sad 1936–1937
 József Kezdi – Jedinstvo Belgrade 1937–1938
 Lajos Kovács – NAK Novi Sad 1937–1942
 Ede Krausz – SAND Subotica 1921–1923
 Béla Mayer – Somborski SK 1923–1924
 Károly Nemes – NAK Novi Sad 1919–1924, Jugoslavija Belgrade 1924–1925
 István Nyers – ŽAK Subotica 1941–1945
 Sándor Peics – Vojvodina 1929–1930
 Ferenc Plattkó – KAFK Kula 1921–1922
 József Rumos – NAK Novi Sad 193_–1941
 József Schaller – KAFK Kula 1924–1925
 Lajos Schönfeld aka Tusko – NAK Novi Sad 1918–1920, Vojvodina 1921–1922, BSK Belgrade 1922–1924
 Vilmos Sipos – Jugoslavija Belgrade 1930–1931, Građanski Zagreb 1932–1935, 1939–1940
 Toni Szabó – BSK Belgrade 1921–1924, Slavija Sarajevo 192_–19__
 Sándor Szluha – Vojvodina 1939–1940, NAK Novi Sad 1940–1942
 Sándor Weisz – Juda Makabi 1921–1924, Vojvodina 1924–1925

Italy
 Giovanni Bertotto – Jedinstvo Belgrade 1924–1925
 Luigi Di Franco – Jedinstvo Belgrade 1937–1941, Jugoslavija Belgrade 1941–1942
 Lorenzo Gazzari – Hajduk Split 1923–1928
 Otmar Gazzari – Hajduk Split 1921–1928, BSK Belgrade 1929–1933
 Rodolfo Tommasi – BSK Belgrade 1932–1933

Poland
 Franciszek Sikora – BSK Belgrade 1924–1925

Romania
 Gabi Kovács – Juda Makabi 1923–1924
 Dezideriu Laki – BSK Belgrade 1924–1925
 Teodor Mogin – Vojvodina 1924–1925
 Iulian Popan – Juda Makabi 1923–1924
 Virgil Popescu – Vojvodina 1938–1941
 Rudolf Wetzer – BSK Belgrade 1924–1925

Soviet Union
 Leonid Bayer – BASK Belgrade 1940–1942
 Vladimir Kirsanov – Lovćen Cetinje 1920–1925
 Uchuk Kuldinov – Jedinstvo Belgrade 193_–1933, Jugoslavija Belgrade 1933–1937
 Anton Pushin – Jugoslavija Belgrade 1936–1937
 Georgi Shishlov – Mačva Šabac 1924–1925
 Nikolai Simeonov – Vojvodina 1923–1924
 Vsevolod Stashevskiy – BSK Belgrade 1924–1925
 Samuilo Suzina – BSK Belgrade 1924–1925
 Sargis Vardanov – Građanski Skoplje 1923–1924
 Sergei Vitvinskiy – Vojvodina 1922–1924

Turkey
 Javid Nuri – Građanski Skoplje 1923–1924

References

External links
 Foreign players in NBI chronologically at nela-hu 

Communist countries in Europe
Association football player non-biographical articles